The Protestant Luisenfriedhof III is a cemetery in the Westend district of Berlin. The cemetery is under monument and cultural heritage protection.

History
A church-owned and operated cemetery with a size of 12 hectares, Luisenfriedhof III was consecrated in 1891 and the first burial took place on 19 June 1891.
Two years later, a cemetery chapel was built. The early Gothic red brick building was designed by Johannes Vollmer and Heinrich Jassoy. The steeple of the chapel was destroyed in World War II.
In 1905, the cemetery expanded to its present size.

Notable burials
Notables buried include:
 Georg Bleibtreu (1828–1892), painter
 Heinrich Karl Brugsch (1827–1894), Egyptologist
 Wilhelm Cauer (1900–1945), mathematician and scientist
 Heinrich Dernburg (1829–1907), jurist, professor, and politician
 Ernst Förstemann (1822–1906), historian, archivist and librarian
 Georg Heym (1887–1912), writer and poet
 Fritz Kolbe (1900–1971), diplomat and spy for the Allied forces
 Brigitte Mira (1910–2005), actress
 Karl August Möbius (1825–1908), zoologist
 Eva Renzi (1944–2005), actress
 Rosel Zech (1942–2011), actress

Gallery

References

External links 

 bildindex der Kunst und Architektur: chapel
 Ev. Luisenfriedhof III (Luisenkirchhof) – Gesamtanlage unter Denkmalschutz im Lexikon des Bezirks Charlottenburg-Wilmersdorf
 

Cemeteries in Berlin
Lutheran cemeteries
Charlottenburg-Wilmersdorf
Lutheran cemeteries in Germany